Naval Governor  may refer to:    

 Naval Governor of American Samoa, the territorial executive of American Samoa
 Naval Governor of Guam, the territorial executive of Guam